The Barreira do Inferno Launch Center is a rocket launch base of the Brazilian Space Agency. It was created in 1965, and is located near Ponta Negra beach, near Natal, the capital of the state of Rio Grande do Norte. It has been used for 233 launches from 1965 to 2007, reaching up to 1100 kilometers altitude.

It provides tracking support for launches from the Alcântara Launch Center and Guiana Space Centre.

Launches

The following rockets have been launched from CLBI:
Loki-Dart
Nike-Cajun 
Orion-OLV 
Nike-Apache
Aerobee 150
Javelin 
Nike-Tomahawk 
Black Brant 4A 
Nike-Iroquois 
Boosted Dart 
Super Arcas 
Rocketsonde 
Black Brant 5C 
Black Brant 4B 
Paiute Tomahawk 
Castor Lance 
Black Brant 8B 
Sonda 3
Skylark 12 
Cuckoo 4
Nike Orion
Sonda 4 
VLS-R1 
VS-30

Projected
Operação São Lourenço -  VS-40/SARA Suborbital I

References

External links
 Official site

Spaceports
Rocket launch sites
Space program of Brazil